James Patrick Farrell (born March 1, 1960) is an American politician in the state of Minnesota. He served in the Minnesota House of Representatives.

References

Democratic Party members of the Minnesota House of Representatives
1960 births
Living people
Politicians from Saint Paul, Minnesota
Minnesota lawyers
William Mitchell College of Law alumni
University of Minnesota alumni